Syllepte occlusalis is a moth in the family Crambidae. It was described by Paul Dognin in 1905. It is found in Ecuador's Loja Province and Costa Rica.

References

Moths described in 1905
occlusalis
Moths of Central America
Moths of South America